Ust-Kormikha is a rural locality (a selo) in Ust-Volchikhinsky Selsoviet, Volchikhinsky District, Altai Krai, Russia. The population was 108 as of 2013. There is 1 street.

Geography 
Ust-Kormikha is located 28 km south of Volchikha (the district's administrative centre) by road. Valovoy Kordon is the nearest rural locality.

References 

Rural localities in Volchikhinsky District